The Dexter Coffin Bridge is a crossing for Interstate 91 over the Connecticut River north of Hartford, Connecticut, connecting the towns of Windsor Locks, Connecticut and East Windsor, Connecticut.  It can be seen from the Windsor Locks Amtrak station.

History
In 1952, plans were made to cross the Connecticut River at Windsor Locks for I-91, so the highway would not cross Windsor Locks's tobacco fields at the river. Plans were started in 1954 for the bridge, which would replace an outdated bridge near the same location. The bridge was started construction in 1957 and was completed and dedicated on July 11, 1959.

See also
 
 
 
 List of crossings of the Connecticut River

References

External links

Bridges over the Connecticut River
Windsor Locks, Connecticut
Bridges completed in 1959
Interstate 91
Bridges in Hartford County, Connecticut
Road bridges in Connecticut
Bridges on the Interstate Highway System
Steel bridges in the United States
Arch bridges in the United States